Lero is an obscure Celtic god, invoked alongside the goddess Lerina as the eponymous spirit of Lérins in Provence. Nothing is known about these gods apart from these epigraphic dedications.

References

Further reading 
 Dictionary of Celtic Myth and Legend. Miranda Green. London: Thames and Hudson, 1997.

Gaulish gods
Lérins Islands